The Willis M. Graves House, also known as the Graves-Fields House and Oakcrest, is a historic home located on Oberlin Road in Raleigh, Wake County, North Carolina. It was built about 1884 in the freedmen's village of Oberlin, and is a two-story, frame Queen Anne style dwelling.  It has a projecting, two-story polygonal bay capped by a very large gable; one-story wraparound porch; and a projecting, two-story square tower with a pyramidal roof.  It was built by Willis M. Graves, an African-American brick mason.

It was originally listed on the National Register of Historic Places in 2002 (#02000500). It was delisted in 2019 due to being relocated, but was relisted again in 2021.

See also
 List of Registered Historic Places in North Carolina

References

African-American history in Raleigh, North Carolina
Houses on the National Register of Historic Places in North Carolina
Houses completed in 1875
Queen Anne architecture in North Carolina
Houses in Raleigh, North Carolina
National Register of Historic Places in Raleigh, North Carolina